Shaari Zedek Synagogue, also known as Congregation Achavat Achim and since 1944 as St. Leonard's Church, is a historic synagogue at 767 Putnam Ave. in Bedford-Stuyvesant, Brooklyn, New York.  It was built in 1909–1910 and is a two-story rectangular brick building with cast stone trim.

It was listed on the National Register of Historic Places in 2009.

References

External links
The New York Landmarks Conservancy: Conservancy Guides Historic Brooklyn Synagogues Towards State, National Register Listing

Synagogues in Brooklyn
Properties of religious function on the National Register of Historic Places in Brooklyn
Synagogues on the National Register of Historic Places in New York City
Synagogues completed in 1910
1910 establishments in New York City